The Shops at Tanforan is a regional shopping mall in San Bruno, California, United States.

The site was originally used as a horse racing track from 1899 until 1964, when the grandstand was destroyed by fire. During World War II the track was used as the Tanforan Assembly Center where Japanese American citizens, primarily from the San Francisco Bay Area, were interned until more permanent War Relocation Centers were opened. A shopping mall was built on the site and opened in 1971. The mall underwent a 3-year renovation, and reopened in 2005. In 2022, Alexandria Real Estate completed its acquisition of the site and announced the mall would be demolished and replaced with a biotech campus.

History
The site that The Shops at Tanforan mall is built on has served at various times as a racetrack, airfield, a military training center, a Japanese American internment camp, and a golf course.

Racetrack

The Tanforan Racetrack was built in 1899. It was named after Toribio Tanforan, the grandson-in-law of Jose Antonio Sanchez, the grantee of Rancho Buri Buri; the name was corrupted to Tanforan shortly. The Western Turf Association acquired  of land and began construction of the grandstand by September 1899, which was estimated to cost  and scheduled to open in time for the season in November. Approximately 700 men were laboring to complete the track, and by late September, paving work had begun for the road servicing the new track, requiring  of gravel.

Horse, dog, motorcycle, and auto races were held year-round at the track. One of Tanforan's most famous residents while it was used as a racetrack was Seabiscuit, who was stabled there for a time.  Today, a statue of Seabiscuit may be found on the grounds of the Tanforan mall.

The site found other uses after 1909, when the state of California banned all gambling at racetracks. Races were held at Tanforan until the racetrack was destroyed by fire on July 31, 1964.

Airfield
Tanforan Racetrack was occasionally used as an airfield, with the center of the racetrack used as a runway.  On January 25–26, 1910, the Tanforan Racetrack served as the site for the Second International Air Meet in America, organized by the Pacific Aero Club and attended by aviation notables Louis Paulhan and John J. Montgomery.

On January 18, 1911, aviator Eugene Ely made naval aviation history when he took off from Tanforan and made a successful landing on the USS Pennsylvania anchored in San Francisco Bay.  This marked the first successful shipboard aircraft landing (and the second successful take-off). A plaque on the grounds commemorates this event.

Tanforan was temporarily converted into a military training center during World War I.

Tanforan Assembly Center

During World War II, Tanforan was used as the Tanforan Assembly Center, an internment camp for Japanese Americans, nearly all from the San Francisco Bay Area.  Tanforan was the second most populous of the 17 "civilian assembly centers" where internees were detained before being relocated to more permanent (and remote) "relocation centers;" most internees at Tanforan were sent to the Topaz War Relocation Center near Delta, Utah.  Twenty-six of the 180 "apartment" barracks were converted from horse stalls.  8,003 people were held at Tanforan from April 28 to October 13, 1942, with a peak population of 7,816 in July.  A plaque outside the mall notes this history.

When the Assembly Center closed in 1942 the site became the US Army's Camp Tanforan. At the camp were the California Field Artillery Regiments. In 1944, the camp became the Naval Advance Base Personnel Depot, San Bruno, which closed on October 10, 1946. A number of soldiers who were once stationed at camp are buried at the Golden Gate National Cemetery, which is located on a nearby hill that overlooks the Tanforan site.

After the war, Tanforan returned to its former role as a race track, with a golf course in the center of the track.  The track went into decline in the 1950s due to competition from Bay Meadows, and then burned down on July 31, 1964.

Shopping Mall
In 1971, the Tanforan Park Shopping Center was built on the Tanforan racetrack site. The mall was designed by Victor Gruen Associates; the second floor was built as a mezzanine to allow a two-story ceiling above the center of the ground floor. Under the First Phase, the central mall and Sears store were scheduled for completion by February 1971. The First Phase also included  of leasable area with space for 65 stores. The Tire, Brake, and Accessory Section of Sears was the first store to open at Tanforan, on October 7, 1970.

The mall is bounded by El Camino Real (to the west), Sneath Lane (north), Huntington Avenue (east), and Interstate 380 (south). Property ownership was split between Sears, which owned the northern  portion of the site; Hapsmith, which owned the central ; and JC Penney, the southern .

The Emporium was the site's third anchor, opening that location in 1971; following the chain's acquisition by Federated Department Stores in 1995, the Tanforan Emporium was closed and the building was purchased by Target Stores in 1996. By that time, the dated mall was perceived as "dark and ugly" and occupancy had fallen to less than half, although anchor tenants continued to perform well. In 1999, the mall was purchased from Hapsmith by real estate investment firm Wattson Breevast LLC, who planned to redevelop it; Hapsmith retained a portion of the mall. There were many issues the new owners had to overcome: an eminent domain lawsuit involving BART, getting consent from the three existing anchors, each of which owned their property, moving out long-term tenants, existing building materials, and other city issues. It would be four years before the project's operations were ready to begin. After resolving a string of legal, construction, and administrative issues, renovations finally began in 2003. The existing stores were closed and the structure was gutted, retaining only the exterior walls, with the exception of the three main anchors (Target, Sears, and J.C. Penney), all of which remained open throughout the major reconstruction. A groundbreaking ceremony for the reconstruction was held on February 9, 2004. BART's new station opened in 2003 on what was part of the original mall's property; in 2001, the four property owners received $34 million as a settlement from the eminent domain proceedings of BART, which was used to fund the three-level parking structure.

Reconstruction

Altoon + Porter Architects was hired for the mall's new design, and Brio Engineering Associates performed consulting engineering for the remodel and expansion. The US$140 million project was completed after 20 months. On October 7, 2005, the mall reopened as The Shops at Tanforan, adding  of shops and restaurants, including a new main entrance (facing El Camino Real) and food court. A two-level Barnes & Noble bookstore and a BJ's Chicago Brewhouse flank the new glass atrium entrance facing El Camino. The mall was also scheduled to add a new parking garage and movie theater. The increased sales tax revenue for the city of San Bruno helped to offset the closure of a longtime Ford dealer. On April 18, 2008, Century Theatres held its grand opening for a new  20-screen theater complex at this location, with a skybridge connecting the mall to the new building. The bottom floor of the garage also serves as a walkway to both a new substation of the San Bruno Police Department and the adjoining San Bruno BART station.

Decline
In 2015, Sears Holdings spun off 235 of its properties, including the Sears at The Shops at Tanforan, into Seritage Growth Properties. The mall property was sold by Breevast to Queensland Investment Corporation (QIC), an Australian investment firm, in August of that year for $174 million. The property's Sears store was sold to mall ownership in 2018. The store later closed in early 2020. It was later sold to Alexandria Real Estate in late 2021 for $128 million.

At approximately the same time, the retail apocalypse of shifting shopping online, accelerated by the COVID-19 pandemic in California hurt the mall's businesses and foot traffic. On July 2, 2019, a shooting occurred on the upper level of the food court; as a precaution, the mall and nearby BART station were evacuated. Four people were injured during the shooting, which left some reluctant to return to the mall. Four teenagers were arrested in connection with the shooting. Later that year, retailer Forever 21 went bankrupt and announced plans to close the company's San Bruno location at Tanforan. As part of JCPenney's 2020 bankruptcy process, the company's store in San Bruno was sold to Alexandria Real Estate for $105 million, though the store remained in operation.

Closure
On July 27, 2021, the San Bruno City Council adopted the Reimagining Tanforan Land Use Fact Sheet, encouraging potential land owners to explore non-retail options at the site, including office, residential, and hotel uses. In February 2022, Alexandria announced it had purchased the remaining central portion of the mall property from QIC, including the mall's Target store, and confirmed it would transform the property into a "megacampus" of biotech and technology firms.

Gallery

References

External links

 Official site
 San Bruno's History page, which reveals some of Tanforan's history

Shopping malls in San Mateo County, California
History of the San Francisco Bay Area
Internment camps for Japanese Americans
Shopping malls in the San Francisco Bay Area
San Bruno, California
Shopping malls established in 1971